In Alevism, Muhammad-Ali refers to the individuals Muhammad and Ali who exist as a single entity, or light of Aql.

The origin of this belief can be the well-known following Shi'a hadith

References

Alevism
Ali
Muhammad